The following lists events that happened during 1922 in Southern Rhodesia.

Events

October
 27 October - Whites and only 60 of Southern Rhodesia's Africans vote at the  Southern Rhodesia government referendum and reject a union with South Africa

Births

Deaths

References 

 
Years of the 20th century in Southern Rhodesia
Zimbabwe
Zimbabwe, 1922 In